Eremias strauchi, commonly known as Strauch's racerunner, is a species of lizard in the family Lacertidae. The species is native to Western Asia. There are no subspecies that are recognized as being valid.

Etymology
The specific name, strauchi, is in honor of Russian herpetologist Alexander Strauch.

Geographic range
E. strauchi is found in southern Armenia, southern Azerbaijan, northeastern Iran, and northeastern Turkey.

Habitat

Longevity and size 
Using the skeletochronological method, 18 adults of E. strauchi living in eastern Turkey were studied for longevity and size. The maximum observed longevity was 7 years for males and 5 years for females.

Reproduction
E. strauchi is oviparous.

References

Further reading
Franzen M, Heckes U (1999). "Eremias suphani Başoğlu & Hellmich, 1968 und Eremias strauchi Kessler, 1878 in der östlichen Türkei: Diagnostische Merkmale, Verbreitung und Lebensräume (Sauria: Lacertidae)". Salamandra 35 (4): 255–266. (in German, with an abstract in English).
Kessler KF (1878). "[Zoological Expedition to Transcaucasian Territory in 1875]". [Transactions of the St. Petersburg Society of Naturalists] 8: 1–200. (Eremias strauchi, new species, p. 166). (in Russian).
Rastegar-Pouyani E, Yousefkhani SSH, Wink M (2015). "Taxonomic reevaluation of Eremias strauchi strauchi Kessler, 1878 and Eremias strauchi kopetdaghica Szczerbak, 1972, based on nuclear and mitochondrial DNA sequences (Reptilia: Lacertidae)". Zoology in the Middle East 61 (2): 118–124.
Sindaco R, Jeremčenko VK (2008). The Reptiles of the Western Palearctic. 1. Annotated Checklist and Distributional Atlas of the Turtles, Crocodiles, Amphisbaenians and Lizards of Europe, North Africa, Middle East and Central Asia. (Monographs of the Societas Herpetologica Italic). Latina, Italy: Edizioni Belvedere. 580 pp. .

Eremias
Reptiles described in 1878
Taxa named by Karl Kessler